Sārasvatī Suṣamā is a research journal published in Sanskrit. Established in 1942 and published quarterly, the Sārasvatī Suṣamā has been edited by a series of distinguished scholars and has carried important and internationally-recognized research on Sanskrit-related topics.

Origin
Sārasvatī Suṣamā was initially published from Government Sanskrit College Benares in 1942. The editors were:
 Dr. Mangal Dev Shastri
 Tribhuvan Prasad Upadhyay
 Kubernath Shukla

Reputation
During 1958, this college merged into Sampurnanand Sanskrit University. Thereafter the journal was published by the Director, Research Institute, Sampurnanand Sanskrit University, Varanasi, India.

Editors
The editors of the journal since 1957 are listed below.

Nature of publication 
Sārasvatī Suṣamā publishes articles on the following topics.
Research articles on oriental learnings.
Research articles on Pali, Prakrit, Apabhramsa and Culture.
Unpublished small manuscripts edited by scholars.
Criticism of the books.
Continuation work on Purana Index.
Other treaties.

References

1942 establishments in India
Linguistics journals
Publications established in 1942
Sanskrit encyclopedias
Academic journals published in India
Sanskrit-language journals